Panagia Evangelistria is a district of the Municipality of Kato Polemidia.

Location 
To the south it borders with Apostolos Barnabas, to the southeast with Makarios III, to the east with Agia Fyla, to the north with Pano Polemidia and Palodia, and to the west with Ypsonas and Agios Nikolaos.

Government Buildings 
The Limassol General Hospital, the public hospital of Limassol that is divided in 2 different places in Limassol, is located in Panayia Evangelistria district of Kato Polemidia.

Religious Sites 
The sanctuary of the district is dedicated to the Virgin Mary. Construction began in 1908 and was completed in 1959. The inauguration took place in 1963. In Panagia Evangelistria area  the Limassol General Hospital is located, the public hospital of Limassol.

References

Limassol
Populated places in Cyprus